Marguerite-Fadhma Aït Mansour Amrouche ( in Tizi Hibel, Algeria – July 9, 1967 in Saint-Brice-en-Coglès, France) was a poet and folksinger.

Biography

She was born in 1882 in a Kabylie village, the illegitimate daughter of a widow. Facing harsh discrimination from within her surroundings, she left her village to study at a secular school. Later, when she was with the Sisters at Aït Manguellet hospital, she converted to Roman Catholicism. She met another Kabyle Catholic convert, Antoine-Belkacem Amrouche, whom she married in 1898 or 1899. They had eight children together, including writers Jean Amrouche and Taos Amrouche, but only two of the children would remain living by the time of her death. The family first moved to Tunis, where Taos was born, and then France.

During her lifetime, she made a considerable impact on the works of Jean and Taos. The folk songs she sang to her family were compiled and translated to French by Jean in 1939 as Chants berbères de Kabylie. In 1967, Taos made a music album in Kabyle bearing the same title as Jean's folk song collection. 

Her autobiography Histoire de ma vie was published posthumously in 1968. This book discusses mainly about the life she lived as a woman living in two different worlds: between the traditional Kabyle life and language and the colonial power France, its language, and particularly its predominant religion, Christianity.

References

Further reading 
 Fadhma Aith Mansour Amrouche The Story of My Life, Translated, with a new Introduction, by Caroline Stone. (Hardinge Simpole, 2009). .

1882 births
1967 deaths
People from Aït Mahmoud
Kabyle people
Algerian Roman Catholics
Algerian emigrants to France
Algerian musicians
Converts to Roman Catholicism from Islam
Algerian former Muslims
Berber Christians
Berber poets
20th-century Algerian writers
20th-century Algerian women writers